Louis Bauer may refer to:

 Louis Agricola Bauer (1865–1932), American geophysicist, astronomer and magnetician
 Louis H. Bauer (1888–1964), American doctor